The Māori people of New Zealand use the word rohe to describe the territory or boundaries of iwi (tribes), although some divide their rohe into several takiwā.

The areas shown on the map (right) are indicative only, and some iwi areas may overlap.

The term rohe also combines with other words to form more modern terms. These include rohe pōti, meaning an electoral district or constituency, rohe wā, meaning time zone, and whatunga rohe paetata, meaning a local area network. The term rohe on its own has also been adopted to mean an internet domain. The term is also used for the mission districts (rohe mihana) of Te Pīhopatanga o Aotearoa, the Māori Anglican Church in Aotearoa/New Zealand.

See also
 List of Māori iwi

References

External links
 

Iwi and hapū
Māori words and phrases